John Doe: Vigilante (also known as John Doe) is a 2014 Australian crime thriller, directed by Kelly Dolen. The story is written by Kelly Dolen and Stephen M.Coates. The screenplay was written by Stephen M.Coates. The film stars Daniel Lissing, Jamie Bamber, Lachy Hulme and Ditch Davey.

Plot
John Doe (Jamie Bamber) is an ordinary man who decides to take the law into his own hands after the unsolved murder of his wife and nine-year-old daughter.  John Doe then exacts justice by killing other criminals, one at a time.  He films the process and sends it to the media.  However, the mainstream media edits the films, showing only the execution, not the reason.  John Doe then gives the films to a smaller outfit, which publishes them uncut, on the internet.

A movement in support of John Doe's actions ("Speak for the Dead") begins to publicize information about John Doe's "victims" - pimps, rapists, and paedophiles - criminals who were arrested, sentenced and, upon their release, reoffended.

At a night club, two bouncers eject and assault a teenage boy.  He dies and the judge acquitted the bouncers due to their father, the owner of the club bribed the judge.  John Doe kills one of the bouncers with a home-made cyanide patch after he harassed a woman in the elevator.  This inspires copycat vigilantes.  Three teenage boys decide to kill the other bouncer but, instead, the bouncer kills all three as he in high alert after the death of his brother.  This causes the movement to organise more, and the next scene shows the bouncer is ambushed by a larger group and he is killed after one of the vigilante fractures his skull.  

One of the three teenage boys was a patient of John Doe.  The question arises whether John Doe had "influenced" the boys to carry out the actions on his behalf.

The story ends with John Doe filming his interaction with Adam, the criminal who killed his wife and daughter.  The whole incident is broadcast live, and John Doe removes his mask.  He offers Adam an opportunity to plead his case and be allowed to live.

Cast

 Jamie Bamber as John Doe / Mr Jones.
 Daniel Lissing as Jake
 Lachy Hulme as Ken Rutherford, an investigative journalist whom John Doe requested to meet a day before the jury makes its decision.
 Ditch Davey as Detective Clint James
 Sam Parsonson as Murray Wills
 Paul O'Brien as Officer J.Callahan
 Chloe Guymer as Chloe
 Louise Crawford as Leah
 Ben Schumann as Boy
 Fletcher Humphrys as Henry Junig
 Brooke Ryan as Mary
 Gary Abrahams as Sam

Reception
The film received mixed to negative reviews from critics, receiving a rating of 40% on Rotten Tomatoes with an average rating of 3.8/10 based on 5 reviews.

References

External links
 
 

2014 crime thriller films
Australian vigilante films
Australian crime thriller films
Australian serial killer films
Films shot in Melbourne
2010s English-language films
2010s vigilante films